The Embassy of South Korea in London, England, is the diplomatic mission of South Korea in the United Kingdom. South Korea also maintains a Cultural Centre at 1-3 Strand. The official ambassador’s residence is an elegantly understated villa (detached and double fronted) at 4 Palace Gate, Kensington.

As of 2021, South Korea's Ambassador to the United Kingdom of Great Britain and Northern Ireland is Kim Gunn.

Gallery

References

External links
Official website

Year of establishment missing
Korea, South
London
South Korea–United Kingdom relations
Buildings and structures in the City of Westminster

es:Anexo:Embajadores de Corea del Sur en el Reino Unido